Frank Pierce Hill (August 22, 1855 – August 25, 1941) was an American librarian.

Biography
Frank Pierce Hill was born in Concord, New Hampshire on August 22, 1855. He served as president of the American Library Association from 1905 to 1906 and the American Library Institute 1912 to 15. Hill was the first director of the Newark Public Library from 1889 to 1901, when he left Newark to serve as Chief Librarian of the Brooklyn Public Library. Hill served in that position until his retirement in 1930. In 1940 he was awarded Honorary Membership in the American Library Association.

He died at his home in Hartford, Connecticut on August 25, 1941.

Bibliography
 James Bertram; An Appreciation (Carnegie Corporation of New York), 1936
 American Plays printed 1714-1830 (Stanford University Press), 1934
 Library service for soldiers and sailors; the story of the million dollar campaign of the American library association, 1918

References

 

American librarians
1855 births
1941 deaths